Filipino indie folk band Munimuni has released one studio album, one extended play (EPs) and four singles. The band consists of AJ Jiao on lead vocals and guitar, TJ de Ocampo on lead guitar, John Owen Castro on flute and background vocals, Jolo Ferrer on bass, and Josh Tumaliuan on drums.

Albums

Studio albums

Extended plays

Singles

Covers

References

External links
 Munimuni at AllMusic

Discographies of Filipino artists
Pop music group discographies